"Detour (There's a Muddy Road Ahead)" is a Western swing ballad written by Paul Westmoreland in 1945. The original version was by Jimmy Walker with Paul Westmoreland and His Pecos River Boys, issued around the beginning of November 1945.

Background
The title comes from the repetition of detour in the chorus:

Written in the first person, the song tells of the singer's regrets for the choices made in life.

1946 recordings
Spade Cooley (Columbia 36935), with Tex Williams on vocals, had a big hit with it in 1946, spending 11 weeks on the country charts, reaching number two. 
Other artist scoring big with the song in 1946 included Wesley Tuttle, number three Elton Britt, number five, and Foy Willing, number six.

Other versions
A well-known version of the song was the popular recording by Patti Page in 1951. It was released by Mercury Records as catalog number 5682, and first entered the Billboard chart on August 4, 1951, staying for 16 weeks and peaking at number five.

Bill Haley & His Comets for the album Haley's Juke Box (1960; not released as a single)
Dean Martin on his 1965 album Houston
Instrumental version was recorded by Duane Eddy, on his album Have 'Twangy' Guitar Will Travel (1958).
In 2016, American singer Cyndi Lauper recorded "Detour" with Emmylou Harris for her album Detour.

Popular culture
In its various versions, it is the Theme music of the Radio program, "Detour, The Folk, Roots, and World Music Show".

References

Western swing songs
1945 songs
1945 singles
Bill Haley songs
Elton Britt songs
Patti Page songs
Duane Eddy songs